Zashko Films is an American film production and distribution company. It was founded in 2016 by Khawar Farooqi and located in Texas, USA. Zashko Films is Known best for being the producer of Na Band Na Baraati, Money Back Guarantee, and being the distributor of Durj and Sher Dil.

Films 
Zashko Films has produced and distributed several films including:

References 

Mass media companies established in 2018
Film production companies of the United States
Film distributors of the United States
Companies based in Texas